David Kilcoyne may refer to:

 David Kilcoyne (hurler) (born 1962), former hurler from County Westmeath, Ireland
 Dave Kilcoyne (born 1988), Irish rugby union player